Insight Guides, founded by Hans Johannes Hofer, is a travel company based in London with offices in Singapore and Warsaw. It sells customised package tours as well as guide books for hundreds of destinations worldwide. It also produces guide books, travel books, maps, globes, and travel gadgets for travelers.

In 2018, packaged tours represented 18% of revenue.

History
Hofer's first book, published in 1970, was based on the island of Bali, and was funded by a local hotel. From there, he grew his business, creating over 400 guidebooks to over 100 destinations. The Insight Guide branding was first used in the 1980s.

Following its focus on Asian guides during the seventies, the company expand into the Americas in the eighties. Insight Pocket guides were launched in 1991. In the late 1990s, he sold his share of the company to Langenscheidt KG.

In 2014, Insight Guides and Berlitz Corporation Publishing were sold by Langenscheidt to APA Publications. In 2016, the company began bundling digital media with purchases of print products.

In 2017 APA bought Rough Guide from Penguin books.

Products

Books
Insight Guides combines photos with magazine-style features written by local experts. As well as providing readers with reliable, practical travel information, Insight Guides puts a historical and cultural spin on their guidebook content.

Trips
Insight Guides offers bookable trips planned by local experts who live in their specialist destinations. Travellers use the website to select where they want to go and then choose from the various trip itineraries on offer. Travellers are put directly in touch with the destination travel expert; they can then either book the itinerary as it is or customise it to suit their needs.

Podcast
Insight Guides runs a podcast called Insight Guides: The Travel Podcast, which was launched in May 2019 and is hosted by Zara Sekhavati. The podcast explores the history of various locations around the world, with the very first episode being about the history of the Panama Canal.

Mobile app
Insight Guides offers the Insight Guides Walking Eye mobile app, which is offered free with the purchase of a travel guide.

References

External links
 

Atlases
Cartography
Travel guide books